The Lone Star Derby is an American flat Thoroughbred horse race for three-year-olds held annually at Lone Star Park in Grand Prairie, Texas. It is currently an Ungraded stakes race run over a distance of 8.5 furlongs on turf.

Inaugurated in 1997 as an ungraded stakes race, it was elevated to Grade III status in 2002. The race was downgraded by the American Graded Stakes Committee (AGSC) and lost its graded status in 2011. Lone Star Park officials moved the race from dirt to turf for the first time after the AGSC decision and moved it to Lone Star Park's special Memorial Day program dubbed Lone Star Million Day.

For the three years from 2001 through 2003, it was raced at  miles.

Records
Speed  record:
 1:40.88 - Anet (1997)

Largest margin of victory:
  lengths - Wanna Runner (2006)

Most wins by a jockey (tie):
 2 - Jon Court (2001, 2005)
 2 - Victor Espinoza (2006, 2009)

Most wins by a trainer:
 4 - Bob Baffert (1997, 2006, 2009, 2010)

Most wins by an owner:
 As of 2007, no owner has won this race more than once.

Purses
 As of 2010, the purse was lowered to $200,000. It was set at $400,000 for 2008 & 2009.

Winners of the Lone Star Derby

Notes

References
 May 13, 2006 NTRA article on the Lone Star Derby
 Lone Star Derby list of winners at the Lone star Park website

1997 establishments in Texas
Horse races in Texas
Lone Star Park
Flat horse races for three-year-olds
Graded stakes races in the United States
Recurring sporting events established in 1997
Sports in the Dallas–Fort Worth metroplex